The 2012 Tamworth Borough Council election was held on 3 May 2012 to elect members of the Tamworth Borough Council. Ten seats were up for grabs; the Labour Party won 60% of the seats with 48.70% of the vote. The Labour Party became the majority in the council after a Conservative win in 2011.

Ward results

References

2012 English local elections
2012
2010s in Staffordshire